Tricon Residential (formerly Tricon Capital) is a Canadian real estate company. The company invests in single-family rental and multi-family rental homes, and owns about 31,000 properties across the United States and Canada. As of February 2021, the company had about $8.2 billion of assets under management.

History 
Tricon was founded by Geoffrey Matus and David Berman  on June 3, 1988. The company went public in 2010 and was listed on the Toronto Stock Exchange.

Tricon entered the U.S. single-family rental business in 2012 with Tricon American Homes, a wholly owned subsidiary of the company.

In 2017, Tricon bought the American real estate investment trust Silver Bay Realty for $1.4 billion. becoming the fourth largest publicly owned single-family rental company in the United States.

In 2018, Tricon formed a $2 billion single-family rental joint venture to acquire 10,000 homes in the U.S Sun Belt.

In 2019, the company acquired 708 housing units in Nashville, Tennessee for about $210 million. Later during the same year, Tricon formed a $450 million joint venture with Arizona State Retirement System to pursue build-to-rent communities.

In August 2020, Blackstone Group made a $300 million investment in Tricon.

In 2021, Tricon sold a majority stake of its 7300 apartment portfolio in the United States for $425 million in a bid to reduce its overall debt. In March, Tricon and the Canada Pension Plan Investment Board(CPP) announced a joint venture to build 3000 rental apartments in Toronto.

Properties

Single-family rental 
Tricon owns and operates portfolios of single-family rental homes in the U.S. Sun Belt area, with over 35,000 homes in 23 markets across ten states.

Multi-family rental 
In the U.S., Tricon owns a portfolio of 23 multi-family residential properties totaling 7,289 suites in 13 major markets primarily in the Sun Belt region. In Canada, Tricon is an active multi-family rental developer in the Greater Toronto Area. As of March 2020, the company has approximately 3,600 rental units in seven high-rise projects which are at various stages of development in Toronto.

In 2015, the company started development on a multi-family residential rental building in downtown Toronto. The 50-storey building named "The Selby", with 441 housing units was completed in 2019.

Tricon is currently developing "The Taylor", a 36-storey, 286 apartment units building with retail and commercial space in Spadina Avenue, Toronto. The project is expected to be completed in early 2022. The company also plans to develop 2,500 rental units on approximately 12 acres of land which it owns in the West Don Lands, Toronto area.

References

External links

Real estate companies of Canada
Companies based in Toronto